Jesús Iglesias Cortés (born 25 December 1968 in Barcelona) is an S7 swimmer from Spain. He competed at the 1992 Summer Paralympics, he won gold and silver medals in the freestyle and medley relay events respectively, he also won one silver and three bronze medals in the freestyle and butterfly. He competed at the 1996 Summer Paralympics, winning a gold medal in the 100 meter breaststroke, a silver in the 4 x 50 meter 20 points freestyle relay race, and a pair of bronze medals in the 50 meter S7 freestyle race and the 4 x 50 meter 20 points medley relay race. He is a World champion in the breaststroke.

References

External links 
 
 

1968 births
Living people
Swimmers from Barcelona
Spanish male freestyle swimmers
Spanish male butterfly swimmers
Spanish male breaststroke swimmers
Paralympic swimmers of Spain
Paralympic gold medalists for Spain
Paralympic silver medalists for Spain
Paralympic bronze medalists for Spain
Paralympic medalists in swimming
Swimmers at the 1992 Summer Paralympics
Swimmers at the 1996 Summer Paralympics
Medalists at the 1992 Summer Paralympics
Medalists at the 1996 Summer Paralympics
Medalists at the World Para Swimming Championships
S6-classified Paralympic swimmers
S7-classified Paralympic swimmers